Deltoplastis gypsopeda is a moth in the family Lecithoceridae. It was described by Edward Meyrick in 1934. It is found in western China.

References

Moths described in 1934
Deltoplastis
Taxa named by Edward Meyrick